Momism may refer to:
A critical label introduced by essayist Philip Wylie in his 1942 collection Generation of Vipers, referring to an American cult of motherhood
The practice of helicopter parenting and similar intensive and intrusive parenting styles by mothers
"Momisms", a song by the American comedian Anita Renfroe